Bethlehem Steel Lehigh Plant Mill #2 Annex, also known as Merchant Mill No. 2 and the Johnson Machinery Building, is part of the historic steel mill located in Bethlehem in Northampton County and the Lehigh Valley region of eastern Pennsylvania. It is a large, square, two-story brick industrial building.

History
The Mill #2 Annex was built between 1940 and 1942, by the Bethlehem Steel Corporation.    

It was originally designed and built as a surface preparation and finishing mill for the Alloy and Tool Steel Division at Bethlehem Steel's Lehigh Plant in Bethlehem.  

The  Mill No. 2 Annex was added to the National Register of Historic Places in 2004.

The building has since been renovated and currently contains condominiums, two commercial properties, and a parking garage.

See also

References

Bethlehem Steel
Bethlehem, Pennsylvania
Buildings and structures in Northampton County, Pennsylvania
Ironworks and steel mills in Pennsylvania
Industrial buildings completed in 1942
Industrial buildings and structures on the National Register of Historic Places in Pennsylvania
National Register of Historic Places in Northampton County, Pennsylvania
1942 establishments in Pennsylvania
History of Northampton County, Pennsylvania